Esperanto Filmoj is a Mexican-American film and television production company based in Sherman Oaks, California. It is owned by film director Alfonso Cuarón.

The name was coined by Guillermo del Toro, who calls cinematography "the new Esperanto". Filmoj is the Esperanto word for films, and Cuarón has publicly shown his support and fascination for the constructed international language.

An associated company is Producciones Anhelo, owned by Jorge Vergara and Cuarón.

In 2014, the company made its TV show Believe, with Bad Robot and Warner Bros. Television. On December 1, 2021, it was announced that Apple would order its commitment for the show Disclaimer.

Productions
 Duck Season (2004, also distribution in United States)
 Chronicles (2004)
 The Assassination of Richard Nixon (2004)
 Pan's Labyrinth (2006)
 Year of the Nail  (2007)
 The Possibility of Hope (2007)
 The Shock Doctrine (short, 2007)
 Rudo y Cursi (2008)
 Gravity (2013)
 Believe (2014, co-produced with Bad Robot Productions and Warner Bros. Television)
 Roma (2018, co-produced with Participant Media and Netflix)
 The Witches (2020, co-produced with Necropia Entertainment and Warner Bros. Pictures)
 Raymond & Ray (2022, co-produced with Apple Studios)
El Muerto (2024, co-produced with Marvel Entertainment, A2 Productions, Matt Tolmach Productions and Columbia Pictures)
Disclaimer (TBD, co-produced with Apple and Anonymous Content)

See also
Gabriela Rodríguez, producer at Esperanto Filmoj

References

Film production companies of the United States
Privately held companies based in California
Esperanto